The following Confederate States Army units and commanders fought in Maryland's Frederick County Battle of Monocacy on July 9, 1864, during the American Civil War. The Union order of battle is shown separately.

Abbreviations used

Military rank
 LTG = Lieutenant general
 MG = Major general
 BG = Brigadier general
 Col = Colonel
 Ltc = Lieutenant colonel
 Maj = Major
 Cpt = Captain
 Lt = Lieutenant

Other
 w = wounded
 mw = mortally wounded
 k = killed

Army of the Valley
LTG Jubal A. Early

Breckinridge's Corps
MG John C. Breckinridge

Rodes' Corps
MG Robert E. Rodes

Artillery Reserve
Chief of Artillery: BG Armistead L. Long

Cavalry
MG Robert Ransom

References
 Leepson, Marc. Desperate Engagement: How a Little-Known Civil War Battle Saved Washington, D.C., and Changed the Course of American History (New York: Thomas Dunne Books), 2007. 
 Monacacy National Battlefield website

American Civil War orders of battle
Valley campaigns of 1864